Rafael Valentín Valdivieso Zañartu (November 2, 1804 – June 8, 1878) was a Chilean priest and lawyer, who worked as Archbishop of Santiago de Chile between 1848 and 1878.

Biography
Valdivieso was born on November 2, 1804. His parents were Manuel Joaquín Valdivieso and Maciel y de Mercedes Zañartu y Manso de Velasco. He studied law, and he graduated as lawyer on May 23, 1825, in Universidad de San Felipe.

Valdivieso was ordained priest by the Bishop of Santiago Manuel Vicuña Larraín, on July 27, 1834.

Valdivieso worked as a missionary in Chiloé and Atacama Region. He worked as Dean of Theology in University of Chile, and Pius IX designated him Archbishop of Santiago on October 4, 1847.

Valdivieso participated in the First Vatican Council between 1869 and 1870. He was credited by his contemporaries with having greatly reduced corruption among the Chilean clergy. He died on June 8, 1878, and was buried in the Metropolitan Cathedral of Santiago. Mariano Casanova y Casanova succeeded him as Archbishop in 1886.

His slogan was Verum in luce. Bonum in cruce. Virgo in omni patria et in corde.

References

External links

1804 births
1878 deaths
Chilean priests
Universidad de San Felipe alumni
Participants in the First Vatican Council
19th-century Chilean lawyers
Roman Catholic archbishops of Santiago de Chile